Cotyschnolea minuta is a species of beetle in the family Cerambycidae, and the only species in the genus Cotyschnolea. It was described by Martins and Galileo in 2006.

References

Desmiphorini
Beetles described in 2006
Monotypic Cerambycidae genera